Bristol Bach Choir is an auditioned amateur choir based in Bristol, England.

Conductors 

Adrian Beaumont 1967–1978
Alistair Jones 1978–1982
Glyn Jenkins 1982–1999
Peter Leech 1999–2008
Gavin Carr 2009–2011
Christopher Finch 2012

History 
The choir was founded in 1967 by University of Bristol colleagues Alan Farnill and Adrian Beaumont.

They have performed concerts at St George's Church, St Mary Redcliffe and the Victoria Rooms.

References

External links 
 Bristol Bach Choir website

English choirs
Musical groups from Bristol
Musical groups established in 1967
1967 establishments in England